SPQR is a board wargame designed by Richard Berg and Mark Herman, and released in 1992 by GMT Games, as part of the Great Battles of History (GBoH) series of games on ancient warfare. SPQR deals with battles fought by the Roman Republic, and is designed to showcase the strengths and weaknesses of the Roman manipular legion.

There are two editions of the game, the second having changes in some rules.

Scenarios
The game includes five historical scenarios, Cannae, Zama, Cynoscephalae, Beneventum and Bagradas Plains, plus a fantasy scenario pitting Rome against Alexander the Great.

Scale
The game maps are covered with a hexagonal grid, each hex representing 70 yards of distance. Each turn represents about 15–20 minutes, although the rules are designed assuming a loose time scale. Each counter represents 300 to 1000 fighting troops, depending on size and type.  Since little is known about the terrain, numbers of men or types of units engaged, methods of combat, leaders and so on, these games, despite their high level of detail, remain essentially speculative in nature.

Expansions
A number of expansions were released for SPQR:
 Consul For Rome (1992), adding the Battles of the Trebia and the Metaurus
 War Elephant (1992), adding the Battles of Magensia and Raphia
 Pyrrhic Victory (1993) adding the Battles of Heraclea and Asculum
 Africanus (1994)  adding the Battles of Baecula and Ilipa
 Jugurtha (1998) adding the Battles of the Muthul and Cirta
 Deluxe SPQR (2008), combining the Basic SPQR game with all the above expansions, with the exception of Raphia from "War Elephant" and Cirta from "Jurgurtha".  It also includes counters for the battle of Marathon and for the Jewish revolt against the Seleucid Empire
 Barbarian (2008), adding the battles of Lautulae, Tifernum, Sentinum, Telamon and Cremona

Reception
SPQR won the 1992 Charles S. Roberts Award for Best Pre-World War II Boardgame, and Best Wargame Graphics for the map by Mark Simonitch; and an Origins Award for Best Pre-20th Century Boardgame of 1992.

Reviews
 Casus Belli #72 (Nov 1992)

References

External links
 SPQR at GMT Games.
 
 Hoplites, an unofficial computer card game based on SPQR.

Board games about history
Board games introduced in 1992
Board wargames set in Ancient history
GMT Games games
Origins Award winners
Richard Berg games